Cristine Raquel Rotenberg (born October 17, 1988) is a Canadian YouTuber. Primarily known for her nail art videos, Rotenberg ran the YouTube channel Simply Nailogical from 2014 to 2022, which has amassed over 7 million subscribers. In addition to her main channel, she also runs the channels "Simply Not Logical", "SimplyPodLogical", "SimplyPodLogical Highlights" and "Holo Taco". Rotenberg is the owner of the nail polish brand, Holo Taco.

Early life 
Cristine Rotenberg was born on October 17, 1988, in Richmond Hill, Ontario. From 1996 to 2001, Rotenberg starred in 15 commercials for various children's products including Furby and Fib Finder, as well as an insurance commercial, and a theatrical production of Wizard of Oz. At age 13, she played the role of Young Sophia in the 2002 film Charms for the Easy Life. She stopped taking on acting roles when she was about twelve years old to focus on her schooling.

In 2014, Rotenberg received a master's degree in sociology with a concentration in criminology from Carleton University.  Her master's thesis is on the topic of self-injury in prisoners, as a result of prison conditions.

Career 
Rotenberg works as an analyst for Statistics Canada, an agency of the Canadian government. Her work focuses on crime statistics and has included analysis of sexual assault reporting amid the #MeToo movement. Despite lucrative success with her other endeavours, Rotenberg has expressed her desire to maintain her analyst work for reliability and fulfillment not available in her YouTube career.

Rotenberg's Simply Nailogical YouTube channel was launched with her first video on June 18, 2014. The channel was preceded by her Simply Nailogical blog launched in February 2014. She posted pictures of her nail art on the blog and on Instagram, and actively updated her blog until June 2016. On YouTube, Rotenberg initially created short nail art videos that were less than two minutes long. She later began including voiceovers, extending the length and detail of the tutorials, and eventually appeared on-camera. Since launching her channel, Rotenberg has branched out from nail art tutorials to videos about other topics relating to pop culture and nails. Her videos occasionally feature Rotenberg working with holographic items and she has referred to her love of these as "holosexual". Rotenberg uses the phrase "holo taco" in her videos to refer to holographic top coats and later named her own nail polish brand Holo Taco. The phrase came about due to viewers misunderstanding her pronunciation of "top coat" as "taco".

In June 2016, Rotenberg posted a video of herself applying over 100 coats of nail polish titled "100+ Coats of Nail Polish #POLISHMOUNTAIN". The video quickly went viral, and influenced many other YouTubers such as Jenna Marbles. The Daily Dot called it one of 2016's most popular video trends. Soon after the video was posted, her subscriber count doubled. Her video was featured in the Fine Brothers' College Kids React series in August 2016.

Rotenberg has two secondary channels: "Simply Not Logical" was created in September 2015 and primarily contains vlogs; the podcast "SimplyPodLogical" launched in February 2020. An April 2020 episode of the podcast featured Mazowita and Rotenberg interviewing Dr. Howard Njoo, the Canadian government's deputy chief public health officer, about COVID-19.

In April 2019, Rotenberg's Simply Nailogical channel was the 19th most popular YouTube channel in Canada with over 6.8 million subscribers and 1.2 billion views. J-14 magazine described her as "the face of nail art in the internet world".

On July 17, 2022, Rotenberg announced that she would cease producing videos for her main channel in order to focus on her personal life and Holo Taco. However, she will remain active on her secondary channels.

Nail polish lines

Holo Taco 
In July 2019, Rotenberg launched her own nail polish line called Holo Taco. She began brainstorming for the business in 2017 and started prototyping polishes in 2018. The original Holo Taco launch contained two opaque polishes ("One Coat Black" and "Royal-Tea Blue") in addition to three silver holographic top coats. The collection sold out within two hours.

Rotenberg's aim with Holo Taco is the creation of high-quality nail polishes with a special emphasis on special effects polishes, including holographic, multi-chrome, and iridescent components and finishes. Despite higher production costs for special effects polishes, Holo Taco's avowed aim is to keep prices as affordable as possible.

As of 2022, Holo Taco has sold more than 1 million bottles of nail polish.

Collaborations 

Rotenberg has collaborated with several nail polish-producing companies to create collections or specific colors. The Simplynailogical collection by F.U.N. Lacquer consisted of six holographic colors in three separate shades: pink, blue, and black with each having their respective linear holo version. She promoted the collection in a video on her channel and on her blog. Through collaboration with the site Live Love Polish, she released two Starrily brand nail polishes called "Menchie the Cat" and "Zyler the Cat".

Philanthropic work 
Rotenberg has extended financial support to her viewers through tuition giveaways and scholarships. Her annual tuition giveaways have financed post-secondary education for viewers in her home country.

In 2021, she founded a permanent annual scholarship, the Cristine Rotenberg Scholarship for Academic and Creative Pursuits, at her alma mater Carleton University.

Personal life 
Rotenberg has a common law partner, Ben Mazowita. He often appears in her videos to assist her and occasionally participates in her videos. He is the co-host of their podcast SimplyPodLogical. The couple resides in Ottawa with their two cats.

Filmography

Awards and nominations

References

External links 

1988 births
Living people
21st-century Canadian actresses
Beauty and makeup YouTubers
Canadian bloggers
Canadian child actresses
Canadian sociologists
Canadian YouTubers
Carleton University alumni
Comedy YouTubers
People from Richmond Hill, Ontario
Video bloggers
Canadian women bloggers
Cosmetics businesspeople
Nail polish
Actresses from Ontario
Businesspeople from Ontario
YouTube vloggers